Connie's Greatest Hits is a studio album by U. S. Entertainer Connie Francis. The album features the songs from Francis' most successful singles from her breakthrough hit Who's Sorry Now? in early 1958 up to the date of the album's release in November 1959.

The album was repackaged with a new cover design and re-released in March 1962.

Track listing

Side A

Side B

CD Re-issue
In 2012, Connie's Greatest Hits was re-released by Hallmark Records in their "Original Recordings" series, with "Who's Sorry Now" replaced by "Robot Man", "Frankie" replaced by "Valentino" and "Lipstick on Your Collar" replaced by "It Would Be Worth It"

References

Connie Francis albums
1959 greatest hits albums
MGM Records compilation albums
Albums produced by Ray Ellis